Moon McDare was an A. C. Gilbert Company toy line featuring a fictional male astronaut, released in response to the then current interest in outer space and the US/Soviet Space Race. Moon McDare stood approximately 12" (30.4 cm) high and was provided with a variety of space gear, including helmet, backpack and hand tools.

The toyline first appeared in the US in 1965 and continued through the late 1960s. Moon McDare's body was molded in "flesh" colored plastic with ball/socket joints. His accessories were molded in blue, yellow or silver plastic and white space suits. The figure could be found boxed with a "dark blue" jumpsuit and black boots. The accessories were sold separately as shallow bagged "packs" or deluxe sets surrounded by cardboard (similar to a blister pack) - one set featured the "Space Mutt" - Moon McDare's traveling companion.

From A. C. Gilbert Figure Insert
#16130 Moon McDare Action Space Man
He's the all-American astronaut, nearly a foot tall and fully jointed for every natural body motion. McDare comes in jump suit and boots, and you can get everything he needs for space walking and moon exploring: complete, authentic space suit and helmet, oxygen tanks, communications set and many other accessories that really work! His faithful dog, The Space Mutt, comes with his own space suit and equipment. ©1966 The A.C. Gilbert Company

Gilbert Accessory Sets included:
#16281 Moon McDare Space Suit Outfit
Complete Suit
Helmet (3 piece)
Boots (pair)
Gloves (pair)
Suit Air Conditioner
Action Space Gun that shoots harmless space projectiles

#16282 Moon McDare's Space Mutt Set
Moon McDare's intrepid companion comes complete with his own
Space Suit
Helmet and Oxygen Tanks
The Space Mutt is jointed; he sits and stands like a real dog

#16283 Moon McDare Moon Explorer Set
Oxygen Tanks/Power Pack (requires 2 "AA" pen cell type batteries, not included)
Operating Blinker Light Attachment that Plugs into Power Pack
Space Ray Gun which also plugs in
Retractable Umbilical Cord and Pack
Communications Set with Working Compass
Geiger counter that ticks realistically
Movie Camera

#16284 Moon McDare Action Communication Set
Oxygen Tanks/Power Pack (requires 2 "AA" pen cell type batteries, not included)
Operating Blinker Light
Space Camera

#16285 Moon McDare Space Gun Set
Spring Action Space Gun with spears
Ticking Geiger Counter

#16286 Moon McDare Space Accessory Pack
Working Binoculars
Retractable Umbilical Cord and Pack
Communication Set with Real Compass

Moon McDare was marketed by all the major toy stores and also in department store catalogs like Sears, JCPenney, Montgomery Wards, and Spiegel in their Christmas catalogs. Usually McDare accompanied other figures produced by Gilbert, including James Bond figures, Honey West and The Man from U.N.C.L.E. characters Illya Kuryakin and Napoleon Solo. The weapons and accessories offered for Moon McDare were similar to G.I. Joe accessories but of slightly lesser quality. Space Suits with Helmets, gloves and boots were offered for both Moon McDare and Space Mutt.

A correction to the above article.  Moon McDare did not have ball and socket joints.  Instead, he was jointed at head, shoulders and hips only.  It is odd that A.C. Gilbert could do very good modelling of facial features [see their James Bond figure], but could only manage an inferior body. In any case, the stiffness of the plastic spacesuit would have made action poses very difficult to achieve.

Action figures
1960s toys
McDare, Moon